The Literary Digest was an influential American general interest weekly magazine published by Funk & Wagnalls. Founded by Isaac Kaufmann Funk in 1890, it eventually merged with two similar weekly magazines, Public Opinion and Current Opinion.

History
Beginning with early issues, the emphasis was on opinion articles and an analysis of news events. Established as a weekly newsmagazine, it offered condensations of articles from American, Canadian and European publications. Type-only covers gave way to illustrated covers during the early 1900s. After Isaac Funk's death in 1912, Robert Joseph Cuddihy became the editor. In the 1920s, the covers carried full-color reproductions of famous paintings. By 1927, The Literary Digest climbed to a circulation of over one million. Covers of the final issues displayed various photographic and photo-montage techniques. In 1938, it merged with the Review of Reviews, only to fail soon after.  Its subscriber list was bought by Time.

A column in The Digest, known as "The Lexicographer's Easy Chair", was produced by Frank Horace Vizetelly. Ewing Galloway was assistant editor at the publication.

Presidential poll
The Literary Digest is best-remembered today for the circumstances surrounding its demise.

From 1916, it conducted a poll regarding the likely outcome of the quadrennial presidential election. Prior to the 1936 election, the poll had always correctly predicted the winner. 

In 1936, the poll concluded that the Republican candidate, Governor Alfred Landon of Kansas, was likely to be the overwhelming winner against incumbent President Franklin Delano Roosevelt.

In November, Roosevelt won the election in an unprecedented landslide, winning every state except Maine and Vermont while also winning the popular vote by 24.26%. The magnitude of the magazine's error - 19.54% for the popular vote for Roosevelt v Landon, and even more in some states - destroyed the magazine's credibility, and it folded within 18 months of the election. 

In hindsight, the polling techniques employed by the magazine were faulty: although it had polled ten million individuals (of whom 2.27 million responded, an astronomical total for any opinion poll), it had surveyed its own readers first, a group with disposable incomes well above the national average of the time (shown in part by their ability to afford a magazine subscription during the depths of the Great Depression), and two other readily available lists, those of registered automobile owners and that of telephone users, both of which were also wealthier than the average American at the time. 

It is also notable that every other poll made at or around this time predicted Roosevelt would defeat Landon, albeit not to the extent that he ultimately did: most of these polls also expected Roosevelt to receive a maximum of 360 electoral votes.

Subsequent research concluded that as expected, this sampling bias was a factor, but non-response bias was the primary source of the error - that is, people who disliked Roosevelt had strong feelings and were more willing to take the time to mail back a response.

George Gallup's American Institute of Public Opinion achieved national recognition by correctly predicting the result of the 1936 election. Gallup also correctly predicted the (quite different) results of the Literary Digest poll to within 1.1%, using a much smaller sample size of just 50,000, while Gallup's final poll before the election predicted Roosevelt would receive 56% of the popular vote and 481 electoral votes: the official tally saw Roosevelt receive 60.8% and 523.

This debacle led to a considerable refinement of public opinion polling techniques, and later came to be regarded as ushering in the era of modern scientific public opinion research.

See also
 History of opinion polls

References

External links

 Landon in a Landslide: The Poll That Changed Polling
 The Literary Digest archive at HathiTrust

1890 establishments in New York (state)
1938 disestablishments in New York (state)
Defunct literary magazines published in the United States
Magazines established in 1890
Magazines disestablished in 1938
Magazines published in New York City
Weekly magazines published in the United States